Savior is the second and final studio album by American pop rock band Metro Station. It was released independently on June 30, 2015. It is the band's first full-length album since its debut self-titled album, which had been released eight years prior.

Background
Trace Cyrus spoke about the second album Savior that was released 8 years after their first album Metro Station.

"Getting Over You" was released on June 9, 2015 as the lead single and features Falling in Reverse singer Ronnie Radke. "Better Than Me," "Married in Vegas" and "Used By You" were made available for streaming on June 17, 2015. Cyrus said that "Married in Vegas" was his favorite song that the group has released and the song was written in an hour. The band promoted the album with appearances at every date on the 2015 Warped Tour. The band also went on a headlining tour called the "Savior Tour" with supporting acts from Palaye Royale and the Strive.

Track listing

Personnel
Metro Station
 Trace Cyrus - vocals, lead guitar, bass guitar, synthesizer
 Mason Musso - vocals, keyboards, synthesizer, rhythm guitar
 Spencer Steffan - drums, percussion, backing vocals

References

2015 albums
Metro Station (band) albums
Self-released albums